Ronald Patrick Jr. (born November 1, 1991) is a former American football center. He played college football at the University of South Carolina.

Early years
Patrick attended Cocoa High School. He accepted a football scholarship from the University of South Carolina.

Professional career

Dallas Cowboys
Patrick was signed as an undrafted free agent by the Dallas Cowboys after the 2014 NFL Draft on May 12. He was waived on August 30, 2014 and was signed to the practice squad the next day. He was released on September 30, 2014.

Pittsburgh Steelers
On December 17, 2014, Patrick was signed to the Pittsburgh Steelers' practice squad.

Carolina Panthers
On May 11, 2015, Patrick was signed by the Carolina Panthers. On June 17, 2015, he was waived by the Panthers.

Dallas Cowboys (second stint)
On July 28, 2015, Patrick was signed by the Dallas Cowboys. On September 5, 2015, he was waived by the Cowboys. On September 16, 2015, he was signed to the Cowboys' practice squad. On September 29, 2015, Patrick was released by the Cowboys.

Cleveland Browns
On October 5, 2015, Patrick was signed to the Cleveland Browns' practice squad. On December 1, 2015, he was released from practice squad.

Buffalo Bills
On December 9, 2015, Patrick was signed to the Buffalo Bills' practice squad. He was released on May 2, 2016.

Tennessee Titans
On July 29, 2016, Patrick was signed by the Tennessee Titans. On September 2, 2016, he was released by the Titans as part of final roster cuts and was signed to the practice squad the next day. He was released on September 13, 2016.

Washington Redskins
Patrick was signed to the Washington Redskins' practice squad on September 21, 2016. He signed a futures contract with the Redskins on January 2, 2017.

On September 2, 2017, Patrick was waived by the Redskins.

AAF and XFL
In 2019, Patrick joined the Orlando Apollos of the Alliance of American Football. The league ceased operations in April 2019.

Patrick later joined the XFL, being selected in the 2020 XFL Draft by the DC Defenders. He was waived during final roster cuts on January 22, 2020.

References

External links
South Carolina Gamecocks bio

1991 births
Living people
People from Cocoa, Florida
Players of American football from Florida
American football centers
African-American players of American football
South Carolina Gamecocks football players
Dallas Cowboys players
Pittsburgh Steelers players
Carolina Panthers players
Cleveland Browns players
Buffalo Bills players
Tennessee Titans players
Washington Redskins players
Orlando Apollos players
DC Defenders players
21st-century African-American sportspeople